Jerzy Prokopiuk (June 5, 1931 – March 18, 2021) was a Polish anthroposophist, gnostic, philosopher, and translator of literature, born in Warsaw. He translated into Polish works written by Aldous Huxley, Rudolf Steiner, Carl Gustav Jung, Max Weber and many other authors. He died from COVID-19 aged 90.

Works 
 Labirynty herezji, Warszawa 1999, Muza, 
 Ścieżki wtajemniczenia. Gnosis aeterna, Warszawa 2000, doM  wYdawniczy tCHu, 
 Nieba i piekła, 2001, Uraeus, 
 Szkice antropozoficzne, 2003, Studio Astropsychologii, 
 Światłość i radość, 2003, Dom na wsi, 
 Rozdroża, czyli zwierzenia gnostyka, 2004, Wydawnictwo KOS, 
 Jestem heretykiem, 2004, Studio Astropsychologii, 
 Proces Templariuszy, 2005, Wydawnictwo tCHu, 
 Dzieje magii, 2006, wydawnictwo Akasha,

References

External links
Prokopiuk at Gnosis magazine website (Polish language magazine not connected to the English language magazine Gnosis)

1931 births
2021 deaths
Writers from Warsaw
Polish translators
Anthroposophists
Polish occultists
20th-century Polish philosophers
21st-century Polish philosophers
Deaths from the COVID-19 pandemic in Poland